Papurana papua is a species of true frog, family Ranidae. It is endemic to New Guinea and found in the northern part of the island in both Indonesia and Papua New Guinea as well in some offshore islands (including Normanby, Waigeo, and Manus Island). Common name Papua frog has been coined for it.

Description
Papurana papua is a comparatively small frog. The limbs are short, giving this frog an oddly elongated appearance. The upper lip is white and contrasts with the surrounding dark ground color. As typical for the genus, dark post-ocular mask is present, but it is not clearly demarcated posteriorly. The sides have low-contrast pattern of brown clouded over white, gray, or faint yellow. The venter is white or with faint, dark yellow cast, evenly suffused with dark punctations or gray clouding. The dorsum is smooth or finely granular and has few, scattered, large, dark brown warts.

The male advertisement call is a single pulsed note, sounding like a "quack".

Habitat and conservation
Breeding takes place in pools and swamps. It is an abundant and widely distributed species. No significant threats to it are known. It lives in some protected areas.

References

papua
Amphibians of Western New Guinea
Amphibians of Papua New Guinea
Amphibians described in 1830
Taxa named by René Lesson